The General Electric J73 turbojet was developed by General Electric from the earlier J47 engine. Its original USAF designation was J47-21, but with innovative features including variable inlet guide vanes, double-shell (inner and outer) combustor case, and 50% greater airflow was redesignated J73. Its only operational use was in the North American F-86H.

Design and development

An engine, uprated from the J47, was required for the F-86H. The mass flow was increased by relocating accessories from the centre of the compressor inlet to the underside of the engine. This allowed a reduction in blade hub diameter, which together with an increase in tip diameter, gave a bigger area for air to enter the compressor. The area through the combustion chambers also had to be increased. This was done by replacing the multiple individual chambers with a single annular casing with individual flame tubes or cans known as cannular.

The pressure ratio was increased and variable inlet guide vanes fitted to prevent low-RPM problems (rotating stall/blade flutter) with the higher design pressure ratio. A 2-stage turbine was required.

A low boost (10% at take-off) afterburner was fitted. It was known as a tailpipe augmentation (TPA) system.

Nuclear powered

Four J73 engines were converted to produce thrust using nuclear energy instead of jet fuel. Testing was done in 1957 at the Atomic Energy Commission's National Reactor testing station. The engines were modified to pass the compressor air through a heat exchanger, in which heat was transferred from a nuclear reactor, before entering the compressor turbine at 1,400 degrees F.

Variants

J73-GE-1
J73-GE-3 for the North American F-86H Sabre.
J73-GE-5 Variant intended for a proposed Advanced F-89.

Applications

 North American F-86H Sabre
 Republic YF-84J Thunderstreak, two prototypes

Specifications (J73-GE-3)

See also

References

Further reading

External links

General Electric J73 Turbojet – National Museum of the United States Air Force

J73
1950s turbojet engines
F-86 Sabre